Leslie Jean Mann (born March 26, 1972) is an American actress. She has appeared in numerous films, including The Cable Guy (1996), George of the Jungle (1997), Big Daddy (1999), Knocked Up (2007), 17 Again (2009), Funny People (2009), This Is 40 (2012), Blockers (2018) and Croods: A New Age (2020).

Early life
Mann was born in San Francisco, California, and grew up in Newport Beach. She was raised by her mother, Janet, who led design and quality programs for eight years at Ayres Hotel group. Mann has stated of her father, "My dad is...I don't really have one. I mean, he does exist, but I have zero relationship with him." She has two siblings and three older step-brothers. Her maternal grandmother, Sadie Viola Heljä Räsänen, was the daughter of Finnish immigrants.

Mann has said that she was "very shy, kind of pent-up" during her youth. She graduated from Corona del Mar High School, and studied acting at the Joanne Baron / D.W. Brown Acting Studio and alongside comedy improv troupe The Groundlings. She attended college and studied communications, but dropped out before graduating.

Career

Mann began her career at 18, appearing in a number of television commercials. In 1996, she appeared in The Cable Guy, followed with performances in Freaks & Geeks, Sam Weisman's George of The Jungle alongside Brendan Fraser, Big Daddy with Adam Sandler, Orange County opposite Jack Black, and The 40-Year-Old Virgin with Steve Carell.

In 2007, Mann starred alongside Seth Rogen and Paul Rudd in Judd Apatow's comedy Knocked Up, which grossed more than $218 million worldwide. Her performance brought rave reviews and a "Best Supporting Actress" nomination from the Chicago Film Critics Association. The film won the People's Choice Award for "Favorite Movie Comedy", was named one of AFI's "Top Ten Films of the Year", and received a "Best Comedy" nomination from the Broadcast Film Critics Association Awards.

In 2009, Mann reunited with her Big Daddy co-star Adam Sandler and Knocked Up co-star Seth Rogen for Apatow's Funny People. This film was named to many of the year's top ten lists, including The New Yorker and The New York Times. Elle writer Mickey Rapkin said that "[Mann] owns the second half of 2009's Funny People, where her character does the most unlikely thing a woman can do in a major studio picture: has an affair with an ex-boyfriend on a whim." That same year, Mann also starred in Burr Steers' successful comedy 17 Again opposite Zac Efron and Matthew Perry, which grossed over $125 million worldwide.

She was also seen in the indie hit I Love You Phillip Morris alongside Jim Carrey and Ewan McGregor. It premiered at the 2009 Sundance Film Festival and, on release, received critical acclaim, including a "Best Comedy" nomination for a 2011 Broadcast Film Critics Association Award. Mann also starred alongside Elizabeth Banks in the film What Was I Thinking?, based on the book by Barbara Davilman and Liz Dubelman, which was filmed in 2009 but never released.

In 2011, Mann starred opposite Ryan Reynolds and Jason Bateman in David Dobkin's comedy The Change-Up. She also lent her voice to "Linda", the main human character in Carlos Saldanha's animated film Rio, which earned over $484 million worldwide and also featured vocal performances by Jamie Foxx and Anne Hathaway; as well as to Jonah Hill's animated FOX television series Allen Gregory, as the title character's second-grade teacher.

Mann continued her voice performance work in 2012 with her role in ParaNorman, an animated 3D stop-motion film from Chris Butler and Sam Fell.

In December 2012, she appeared opposite Paul Rudd in Apatow's This Is 40, the sequel to Knocked Up. The movie reunited the trio from the first film, with Mann and Rudd reprising their characters. The sequel was written and directed by Judd Apatow, and included the couple's two daughters in the cast. In contrast to Knocked Up, This Is 40 centered squarely on Mann's character and her family. An early response to Mann's performance from Elle Magazine states that "[she] doesn't just walk off with scenes—she steals the show". Mann was nominated for Best Actress in a Comedy by the Broadcast Film Critics Association for This Is 40.

In 2013, Mann appeared in Sofia Coppola's The Bling Ring, with Emma Watson. Inspired by actual events, the film follows a group of fame-obsessed L.A. teenagers who burgled celebrity homes by tracking their whereabouts on the Internet.

In 2014, she narrated "Women in Comedy", an episode of Season 2 of Makers: Women Who Make America.

In 2018, Mann starred as a single mother in the sex comedy Blockers and reunited with Steve Carell in Welcome to Marwen.

Personal life

On June 9, 1997, Mann married director and producer Judd Apatow, whom she met while auditioning for The Cable Guy. Apatow, one of the film's producers, read the lines to auditioning actresses as a stand-in for Jim Carrey. Mann and Apatow have two daughters, Maude and Iris, who both appeared in the films Knocked Up, Funny People, and This Is 40 as the children of Mann's characters. In 2017, Mann and elder daughter Maude appeared together in commercials for Jergens Skin Care products.

Mann and Apatow are both longtime supporters of the nonprofit organization 826LA, which focuses on encouraging and developing the writing skills of disadvantaged youth. They are also involved with the UCLA Rape Treatment Center's Stuart House, which serves sexually abused children and their families. Mann and Apatow's philanthropic contributions were honored in 2012 by the Bogart Pediatric Cancer Research Program, which awarded them the 2012 "Children's Choice Award" for their work with children and families dealing with pediatric cancer. In 2009, they were also recognized by The Fulfillment Fund, which honored them at its annual benefit gala.

Filmography

Film

Television

References

External links

 
 Interview with Backstage

1972 births
Living people
20th-century American actresses
21st-century American actresses
Actresses from Newport Beach, California
Actresses from San Francisco
American film actresses
American people of Finnish descent
American television actresses
American voice actresses